Hwangju station is a railway station in Hwangju County, North Hwanghae Province, North Korea. It is the junction point of the P'yŏngbu Line, which runs from P'yŏngyang to Kaesŏng, and the Songrim Line, which begins at Hwangju and runs to Songrim.

The station, originally called Hwanghae Hwangju station, was opened by the Temporary Military Railway in 1905.

References

Railway stations in North Korea
Buildings and structures in North Hwanghae Province
Railway stations in Korea opened in 1905